The Puritan is a bronze statue by sculptor Augustus St. Gaudens in Springfield, Massachusetts, United States, which became so popular it was reproduced for over 20 other cities, museums, universities, and private collectors around the world, and later became an official symbol of the city, emblazoned on its municipal flag. Originally designed to be part of Stearns Square, since 1899 the statue has stood at the corner of Chestnut and State Street next to The Quadrangle.

History

In 1881, Chester W. Chapin, a railroad tycoon and congressman from Springfield, Massachusetts, commissioned the renowned sculptor Augustus Saint-Gaudens to create a bronze likeness of his ancestor, Deacon Samuel Chapin (1595–1675), one of the early settlers of the City of Springfield. By 1881, Springfield had become one of America's most innovative industrial and manufacturing centers, and was one of the wealthiest cities in the United States.

The sculpture, cast at the Bureau Brothers Foundry in Philadelphia, was unveiled on Thanksgiving Day, November 24, 1887 in Stearns Square, between Bridge Street and Worthington Street — a collaboration between the artistic "dream team" of Stanford White (of the renowned architecture firm McKim, Mead, and White) and Saint-Gaudens — and featured numerous sculptural and landscape architectural details to enhance the sculpture. However, in 1899 the statue was moved to Merrick Park, on the corner of Chestnut and State Streets next to the old city library, which would later become part of Springfield's Quadrangle cultural center. The statue has remained there ever since, and contrary to the efforts that went into design of Stearns Square, even before its unveiling Saint-Gaudens had expressed interest in that particular site, with one writer for The Republican agreeing in 1886 that "a position on the city library grounds, on the contrary would exhibit the artist's intent to the best advantage."

In 1983, the statue's location was briefly reconsidered as City Councilor Mary Hurley sought to restore it to its original location in the Stearns Square landscape. This move was initiated in part due to the restoration of the Turtle Fountain and other fixtures at that location, though the proposal lacked popular and political support. Then-mayoral candidate Richard Neal was among those public figures who opposed the move and the descendants of Deacon Chapin also actively opposed it, citing that the statue had become a fixture of the Quadrangle's museums and that the original move to its current location was an effort to protect it from vandalism which had occurred in its short stay there prior to 1899.

This sculpture can today be found next to the Springfield City Library, which was constructed adjacent to the site in 1912. The base is inscribed:
"1595 Anno Domini 1675,
Deacon Samuel Chapin,
One Of The Founders Of Springfield"

Likeness

By the time of the statue's design, no authentic portraits of Deacon Samuel Chapin were known to exist; officially the Saint-Gaudens National Historic Site has maintained that the model for the statue's face was Deacon Chapin's descendant Chester W. Chapin, and indeed when producing copies of his work, Saint-Gaudens would say he used Mr. Chapin's facial features as his original model. However, contemporary accounts also describe the original as "no portrait of any Chapin, but a composite in the sculptor's mind of the family type." In 2014, Chicopee city historian Stephen Jendrysik submitted the theory that the figure's face was not a copy of the facial features of Chester Chapin, but rather a subtle tribute to abolitionist John Brown, a devout Calvinist and also a direct descendant of Deacon Chapin. Indeed Chester Chapin was a War Democrat himself, paying for the uniforms of 10th Regiment at the start of the Civil War. The immediate Chapin family also played a pivotal role in Springfield's Underground Railroad movement, including abolitionist Ethan S. Chapin, a business associate of Chester Chapin's, and proprietor of the Massasoit Hotel, a safe house believed to have housed escaped slaves beneath its staircase, which hosted Brown prior to his move to the city in the 1840s.

A controversial figure whose actions escalated tensions between North and South before the start of the American Civil War, Frederick Douglass later eulogized Brown, saying if he "did not end the war that ended slavery, he at least began the war that ended slavery." In the 19th and early 20th centuries he remained an exceedingly infamous figure, regarded by the public both as martyr and terrorist for his raid on Harpers Ferry in an attempt to start a slave revolt. Brown was also an historic figure in Springfield as it was there that he first organized the militant underground railroad movement, the Subterranean Pass Way, and met with Douglass and Harriet Tubman among other influential abolitionist figures.

Indeed in his 2005 work, John Brown, Abolitionist, historian David S. Reynolds repeatedly describes Brown as "The Puritan," as in his own writing Brown repeatedly cited figures such as Jonathan Edwards and Oliver Cromwell as inspiration for his own actions. During the Civil War, Puritan beliefs were held as an influence of the abolitionist movement, met with admiration by Northerners, and resentment by defenders of the South for their adherence to antinomianism, regarded as a philosophy of militant individualism to carry out warfare against institutions. Congressman Samuel S. Cox, who opposed the war, went on to say that "[a]bolition is the offspring of Puritanism. Until Abolition arose, the Union was never seriously menaced; the Constitution was never endangered. Puritanism introduced the moral elements involved in slavery into politics."

Saint-Gaudens, a known admirer of Brown, remains best known for his Civil War memorial works, including the Robert Gould Shaw Memorial on Boston Common honoring the 54th Massachusetts Infantry, the first African-American regiment organized in the northern states during the Civil War. Upon the unveiling of that statue, he would write that the singing of John Brown's Body, a popular Union ballad, by those at the ceremony, reminded him of an emotional moment 30 years prior, when a corps of New England infantry marched past his office at that time singing the same tune. While he never remarked that the statue was a tribute to a second historical figure of the city's history, the facial features that appear on the original Springfield statue have been noted to bear a strong resemblance to Brown's, and in that regard it may doubly serve as a memorial to Puritanism's influence in 17th-century New England, as well as in the Springfield abolitionist movement during the Antebellum Period.

Popularity 

The statue was so popular with the public that Saint-Gaudens decided to produce smaller scale versions of this work under the title The Puritan. He correctly surmised that this would be an excellent source of additional income. Today more than 25 slightly altered copies of this work can be found in museums, art galleries, universities, and private collections around the world. Prominent examples include copies displayed in Boston's Museum of Fine Arts, New York City's Metropolitan Museum of Art, and the Smithsonian Museum of American Art. The statue was also widely used as a symbol by third-party groups, particularly in advertising, as well as a symbol for the New England Society of New York in some of its literature.

The New England Society of Pennsylvanians asked Gaudens to make a replica of The Puritan for the city of Philadelphia, Pennsylvania. For the later commission Gaudens made some changes in the figure's dress and adjusted the facial characteristics to represent a New England type: "For the head in the original statue, I used as a model the head of Mr. Chapin himself, assuming that there would be some family resemblance with the Deacon, who was his direct ancestor. But Mr. Chapin's face is round and Gaelic in character, so in the Philadelphia work, I changed the features completely, giving them the long, New England type, besides altering the folds of the cloak in many respects, the legs, the left hand, and the Bible." The copy, dubbed The Pilgrim, was originally placed on the South Plaza of City Hall but was relocated to its present site in Fairmount Park in 1920.

Numismatist and art historian Cornelius Vermeule, in his volume on U.S. coins and medals, suggested The Puritan was one of American sculptor Cyrus E. Dallin's influences in designing the portrait of Governor William Bradford used on the 1920-1921 Pilgrim Tercentenary half dollar. The obverse of the coin shows a typified portrait of the Puritan separatist, also shown holding a bible under his left shoulder.

Gallery

In popular culture
 The statue plays a pivotal role in the plot of the 1975 mystery-drama The Reincarnation of Peter Proud, directed by J. Lee Thompson. In the film, protagonist Dr. Peter Proud, a professor in California, is haunted by visions of a town in Massachusetts from a past life, with particular focus on The Puritan statue and Springfield's South Congregational Church.
 A rendition of The Puritan is emblazoned in the center of Springfield's flag, adopted by the city in 1923.

See also
 Robert Gould Shaw Memorial, Saint-Gaudens's most prominent piece in Boston, depicting the 54th Massachusetts, the first African-American regiment organized in the northern states during the Civil War
 Miles Morgan, a contemporary of Samuel Chapin whose likeness is depicted in a statue near the Springfield Municipal Group by Jonathan Scott Hartley

References
 Bach, Penny Balkin. Public Art in Philadelphia Temple University Press, 1992.  Philadelphia PA.
 Burt, Henry M. The First Century of the History of Springfield: the Official Records from 1636 to 1736, with an Historical Review and a Biographical Mention of the Founders, Volume I  Henry M. Burt, 1898. Springfield MA. full text online
 Dryfhout, John H. The Work of Augustus Saint-Gaudens University Press of New England, 1982. Lebanon NH.
 Metropolitan Museum of Art, The. "Heilbrunn Timeline of Art History". Metropolitan Museum of Art, 2000. New York NY.
 Tolles, Thayer. "Augustus Saint-Gaudens in The Metropolitan Museum of Art." The Metropolitan Museum of Art Bulletin, v. 66, no. 4 (Spring, 2009).  New York NY.

Notes

External links

 Metropolitan Museum of Art Discussion of the sculpture's history.
Augustus Saint-Gaudens, Master Sculptor, exhibition catalog fully online as PDF from The Metropolitan Museum of Art, which contains material on The Puritan

1887 establishments in Massachusetts
1887 sculptures
Bronze sculptures in Massachusetts
Cultural depictions of John Brown (abolitionist)
Culture of Springfield, Massachusetts
Outdoor sculptures in Massachusetts
Sculptures by Augustus Saint-Gaudens
Sculptures of men in Massachusetts
Tourist attractions in Springfield, Massachusetts
Statues in Massachusetts
Statues of activists